Marya Justine Hornbacher (born April 4, 1974) is an American author and freelance journalist.

Her book Wasted: A Memoir of Anorexia and Bulimia, is an autobiographical account of her struggle with eating disorders, written when she was twenty-three. This is the book which originally brought attention to Hornbacher.  It has been translated into sixteen languages and sold over a million copies in the U.S.

Bibliography
Her first book was Wasted: A Memoir of Anorexia and Bulimia (see above).  This book was updated in May 2014, 15 years after the original date of publication, with a Post Script by Marya Hornbacher, "Hornbacher, an authority in the field of eating disorders, argues that recovery is not only possible, it is necessary. But the journey is not easy or guaranteed. With a new ending to her story that adds a contemporary edge, Wasted continues to be timely and relevant."

Her second book is the critically praised 2005 novel, The Center of Winter, which follows a family in the aftermath of a suicide.

Her third book, published in April 2008, a memoir titled Madness: A Bipolar Life, chronicles the years following Wasted: A Memoir of Anorexia and Bulimia when she was diagnosed with bipolar disorder.

Her fourth book, published in 2010, is the recovery handbook Sane: Mental Illness, Addiction, and the Twelve Steps written as a guide to working the Twelve Steps for people who have both addiction and mental illness.

Her fifth book, published in 2011, Waiting: A Nonbeliever's Higher Power, explores spirituality and what that can mean to someone recovering—from addiction, mental illness, or both—who does not believe in God.

Her second book, The Center of Winter, published in 2005, received excellent reviews, and her second memoir, Madness: A Bipolar Life, was published in 2008. It was met with immediate praise and hit the New York Times Bestseller list. Sane: Mental Illness, Addiction, and the 12 Steps, was published in 2010, and Waiting: A Nonbeliever's Higher Power was published in 2011. Both were finalists for the Books for Better Life Award. Also, within the past several years she has been nominated for the Pushcart Prize in both non-fiction and poetry.

Hornbacher plans to have her sixth book out in early 2019. In an interview in August 2015 conducted by Adam Walhberg of Minnpost, Hornbacher reveals more about the inspiration behind her book and the book itself. She speaks about "the new edition of DSM-5 (Diagnostic and Statistical Manual of Mental Disorders) [which] was released and it created... an... uproar in psychiatry and brain science." In this book, she is writing profiles of 12 people with mental illness to explore these philosophical issues on a more human level.

Biography 
Marya Hornbacher was born in Walnut Creek, California and raised in Edina, Minnesota. She is the only child of Jay and Judy Hornbacher, professional theatre actors and directors. When Hornbacher was fourteen years old, she was accepted into the prestigious arts boarding school Interlochen in northwest Michigan. She later enrolled in the University of Minnesota and started writing for the university's student newspaper The Minnesota Daily. In the fall of 1992, she entered college at American University in Washington, D.C. She eventually obtained her degree in philosophy and poetics from the New College of California.

Personal life 
Hornbacher married Julian Daniel Beard in 1996, but they divorced after the success of Wasted. The marriage, and eventual divorce, is also discussed in Madness where she attributes the nuptial failure in part to problems with drugs and alcohol, and largely to her ill-managed bipolar disorder. Hornbacher then married Jeff Miller.

She has now been sober for more than seventeen years (since the summer of 2001, according to Madness). She was honored with a major award, the ASCAP Award for music journalism, for her profile of jazz great Oscar Peterson (published January 2005).  She is also a two-time Fellow at Yale. She still publishes occasional journalistic pieces, as well as short fiction and poetry.

As of 2014, Marya is working on several projects. She is currently working on a nonfiction book about sex and sexuality in literature. She is also completing a manuscript of poetry and a manuscript of essays and has a novel in the works. Along with her journalism and articles, she teaches in the graduate writing program at Northwestern University in Evanston, IL.

References

External links 
 Marya Hornbacher's official site
 "Rebecca" by Marya Hornbacher in "Gulf Coast: A Journal of Literature and Fine Arts" (26.1)
 Poetry by Marya Hornbacher at Slush Pile Magazine
 Fiction by Marya Hornbacher at Slush Pile Magazine

University of Minnesota alumni
American University alumni
American women journalists
American people with disabilities
1974 births
Living people
People with bipolar disorder